John Edward Morris, M.M. (1889–1987) was an American Roman Catholic priest who served as the Prefect of Peng-yang in Korea from 1930 to 1936.

Born in the United States on 1 January 1889, Morris was ordained a priest for the Roman Catholic Diocese of Fall River in Massachusetts on 13 June 1914. He was solemnly professed a member of the Catholic Foreign Mission Society of America on 31 January 1921. He was appointed the Prefect of Peng-yang by Pope Pius XI on 1 April 1930. After six years of pastoral care to the prefecture, he resigned the post on 31 July 1936.

Morris died on 10 July 1987, aged 98.

References

1889 births
1987 deaths
20th-century American Roman Catholic priests
Maryknoll Fathers
Roman Catholic bishops of Pyongyang